Peterstone Priory a house of Augustinian Canons, was a priory in Burnham Overy, Norfolk, England. It was founded before 1200 and incorporated 1449.

References

Monasteries in Norfolk
Augustinian monasteries in England
12th-century establishments in England
Christian monasteries established in the 12th century